This is a list of Iranian Academy Award winners and nominees. This list details the performances of Iranian filmmakers, actors, actresses and films that have either been submitted, shortlisted, nominated or have won an Academy Award.

Best Supporting Actress

Best Writing, Original Screenplay

Best Writing, Adapted Screenplay

Best Cinematography

Best Costume Design

Best Sound Editing

Best Visual Effects

Best Animated Feature

Best International Feature Film

Best Documentary Short Subject

Best Short Film Live Action

Best Short Film Animated

Nominations and Winners

See also

List of Iranian submissions for the Academy Award for Best Foreign Language Film
Cinema of Iran
List of Asian Academy Award winners and nominees

References

Lists of Academy Award winners and nominees by nationality or region
Cinema of Iran
Academy Award